Anne Laura Herford (1831–1870) was a British artist in the early 19th century, and in 1860, was the first woman to be admitted to the Royal Academy schools. Her career was relatively short, but during that time she exhibited at the Royal Academy twelve times.

Early career
Herford was born on 16 October 1831 to John Herford and Sarah Smith Herford. She studied under Eliza Fox (1824–1903), an artist best known for her genre and portraiture scenes which incorporated contemporary social commentary. Fox held drawing classes for female artists in the living room of her father's home in Regent's Park. Amongst others, Barbara Bodichon and Anna Mary Howitt attended these classes and others run by London-based artists. From the mid-1850s, Herford was heavily involved with the acceptance of women artists. She signed the 1859 petition to admit women to the Royal Academy. She applied under the name 'L. Hereford' and became a pupil in 1861 as the only woman at the Academy.  She exhibited at the Royal Academy from 1861 to 1869 and also at the Suffolk Street Gallery and the British Institution. Hereford exhibited in 1864 a picture entitled A Quiet Corner, and followed up her success by similar domestic scenes in 1865, 1866, and 1867. She invited her sister's daughter, the painter Helen Allingham, to come live with her in London at the start of her career.

Admittance to the Royal Academy

Petitions for women to be accepted into the Royal Academy as students had been submitted to House of Commons since the 1840s, however, the Academy resisted the call for change.

After encouragement from Charles Eastlake and Thomas Heatherley, Herford submitted several drawings to the Academy's admissions tutors signed "L. Herford". The use of initials masked her gender, leading to the assumption that she was a man. She was admitted on the merits of these drawings and an offer was made to "L. Herford, Esq" and she took up her place at the Academy in 1860.

Her entry into the Academy marked a significant turning point for women artists in Britain. By 1863, there were ten women artists at the Academy and at the time of Herford's death there were about 40 women studying the full curriculum which included drawing from a live model.

References

Bibliography

1831 births
1870 deaths
19th-century British women artists
Alumni of the Royal Academy Schools
British artists